Ward End Park is a Green Flag awarded public park located in Ward End, Birmingham.

The park covers an area of 54 acres and contains a historic mansion, the 18th century Ward End Park House.

Facilities include a fishing and boating lake, a basketball court and a tennis court.

References

Parks and open spaces in Birmingham, West Midlands